A list of films produced in Iran ordered by year of release in the 2010s. For an alphabetical list of Iranian films see :Category:Iranian films

2010s

References

External links
 Iranian film at the Internet Movie Database

2010s
Iranian
Films